Pie in the Sky is a British police comedy drama starring Richard Griffiths and Maggie Steed, created by Andrew Payne and first broadcast in five series on BBC1 between 13 March 1994 and 17 August 1997, as well as being syndicated on other channels in other countries.

The protagonist, Henry Crabbe, while still being an on-duty, "semi-retired" policeman (much against his will), is also the head chef at his wife's restaurant "Pie in the Sky", set in the fictional town of Middleton and county of Westershire.

Premise

The series focuses on the life of Detective Inspector Henry Crabbe, who serves in the police force for the fictional county of Westershire. After 25 years on the job, Crabbe wishes to retire and set up his own restaurant, and is brought one step closer after an attempt to catch a high-profile criminal backfires, leaving him shot in the leg. His boss, Assistant Chief Constable Freddie Fisher, is unwilling to let Crabbe leave the Westershire force, and so frames him for taking a bribe, effectively blackmailing him into taking on occasional cases when required.

As a result, Crabbe effectively finds his life divided between his duties as a police detective, and a chef in his new restaurant — "Pie in the Sky" — which he runs with his wife Margaret. Each episode thus focuses on two separate plotlines, in which one sees Crabbe investigating a case, while the other sees him, his wife and their staff dealing with a problem that affects their restaurant.

Cast
 Richard Griffiths as DI Henry Crabbe, detective and restaurant owner. He is an astute detective, a lover of food, and a great cook.
 Maggie Steed as Margaret Crabbe, Henry's wife. She is an accountant and cares little for good food herself, but works in the restaurant and supports Henry's venture, as long as it makes a profit.
 Malcolm Sinclair as ACC Freddy Fisher, Assistant Chief Constable of Police, Henry's boss. He is most concerned with furthering his career, but recognises that Crabbe is an excellent detective.
 Bella Enahoro as WPC [Later DS] Sophia Cambridge, detective (Series 1—4). She is a trustworthy officer who accompanies Crabbe on most cases.
 Mary Woodvine as WPC Jane Morton, police constable (Series 5), accompanies Crabbe on most cases in Series 5.
 Derren Litten as PC Ed Guthrie, police constable (Series 5),  accompanies Crabbe on most cases in Series 5.
 Joe Duttine as Steve Turner, chef (Series 1—2). He is an ex-criminal but an honest worker, and a good young chef.
 Nicholas Lamont as Gary Palmer, chef (Series 3—5). Like Steve, he is an ex-criminal, an honest worker and a good young chef.
 Nick Raggett as Leon Henderson, a food supplier for the restaurant, and occasional worker in the restaurant.
 Alison McKenna as Linda Walker, waitress, and girlfriend of Steve (Series 1)
 Ashley Russell as John Dawson, waiter (Series 1—2)
 Samantha Janus as Nicola Dooley, waitress (Series 2—4)
 Marsha Thomason as Sally Nicholls, waitress (Series 5)
 Robert Putt as Chief Constable Braithwaite, Fisher's boss (Recurring; Series 4—5)
 Caroline Loncq as Jenny Drabble (Recurring; Series 4—5)
 Michael Kitchen as Dudley Hooperman (Series 1)

Episodes

Series 1 (1994)

Series 2 (1995)

Series 3 (1996)

Series 4 (1996)

Series 5 (1997)

Filming locations 
Westershire, the fictional county where the series is set, is based on Berkshire in southern England. Although scenes in Middleton were often filmed in Marlow in Buckinghamshire, the exterior of the restaurant, Pie in the Sky, was filmed outside number 64 High Street in the Old Town in Hemel Hempstead, Hertfordshire. Originally, a florist and then a toy shop, the building became a minor tourist attraction while the series ran, then housed the business of a dolls’-house maker, and as of 2019, a hair salon. A nearby restaurant at 80 High Street renamed itself "Pie in the Sky" (later becoming "Les Amants") to capitalise on the programme's popularity. In Olinda, Victoria in Australia, a very successful restaurant called "Pie in the Sky" also serves many of the TV series' recipes and especially its famous crusty steak and kidney pies.  All internal filming at the restaurant was carried out at Bray Studios at Water Oakley, near Windsor in Berkshire. The local newspaper, the Maidenhead Advertiser, occasionally appears in the series redubbed the 'Barstock and Middleton Advertiser'. Freddie Fisher plays golf at Stoke Park Golf Club at Stoke Poges.

Broadcast, DVD and streaming
The series was originally broadcast in the UK on BBC1 between 13 March 1994 and 17 August 1997.

In Australia, it was originally broadcast on the Australian Broadcasting Corporation. In 2021, it was broadcast on 7two and streamed on 7plus.

The entire series is available on DVD in the UK.

In the United States, Acorn Media has released separate sets of all five series on 12 May 2009 (Series 1), 26 January 2010 (Series 2), 7 September 2010 (Series 3), 25 January 2011 (Series 4) and 2 August 2011 (Series 5). The complete series was released on DVD by Acorn Media on 11 November 2011.

The entire series is available for streaming through AcornTV.

In Australia, Via Vision Entertainment have released series 1 & 2 on 21 July 2021 and will release series 3-5 on 15 September 2021.

All episodes are currently available to watch in the UK via the UKTV Play platform.

All five seasons became available in the US on BritBox in March, 2023.

Notes

External links
 
 

BBC television dramas
BBC television comedy
Fictional restaurants
Television series by Fremantle (company)
1994 British television series debuts
1997 British television series endings
1990s British drama television series
1990s British comedy-drama television series
English-language television shows
British detective television series